Palma Soriano is a Cuban city and municipality in the Santiago de Cuba Province. With a population of 125,385 in the city proper, it is the second-largest in the province and the 16th-largest in Cuba.

History
The city was founded in 1825, uniting ranches (haciendas) that stood in this area, and was the place where the body of José Martí (the leader of the Cuban independence movement, killed in 1895, in the Battle of Dos Ríos) was brought before it was laid in its final resting place in Santiago de Cuba.

Geography
The city of Palma Soriano is located on the banks of the upper Cauto River. The municipality is divided into the localities of Aguacate, Arroyo Blanco, Candonga, Dos Palmas, Dos Ríos, El Maniel, Hatillo, Hicotea, La Candelaria, La Curia, Oriente, Ramón de Guaninao, Soledad, Yarayabo and other minor localities.

Until the 1976 national municipal reform, it included the localities of Alto Cedro, Caney del Sitio, Guaninao, José Martí, Juan Barón, La Concepción, Las Cuchillas, Los Dorados, Norte, Palmarito de Cauto, San Leandro, San Ramón, Santa Filomena and Sur.

Demographics

In 2004, the municipality of Palma Soriano had a population of 124,585.

Transport
The city is crossed in the middle by the state highway "Carretera Central" (CC), the longest highway in Cuba. It is served by two exits (one in the nearby hamlet of Dos Ríos) of the A1 motorway, on the Palma-Santiago de Cuba section.

Palma Soriano railway station is part of the San Luis-Bayamo line, and is served by trains to/from Santiago de Cuba, Guantánamo and Manzanillo.

Personalities
Orestes Kindelán (b. 1964), baseball player
Jorge Molina Enríquez (b. 1966), actor and film director
Ana Fidelia Quirot (b. 1963), field and track athlete
Mey Vidal (b. 1984), Latin Reggae singer

Twin towns
 Berkeley (California, USA)

See also

Municipalities of Cuba
List of cities in Cuba

References

External links

 Palma Soriano on Guije
 Palma Soriano on EcuRed

 
Cities in Cuba
Populated places in Santiago de Cuba Province
Populated places established in 1825
1825 establishments in New Spain
1820s establishments in Cuba
1820s in Cuba